Island Heights is a suburban neighborhood located in Stowe Township, Pennsylvania.  The majority of the neighborhood was constructed circa 1960. It got its name because it sits on a hill overlooking Neville Island. It is home to the newly renovated Island Heights Park.

This small neighborhood was originally accessible from its own township via Fleming Park Road from Pennsylvania Route 51.  The steep stretch of Fleming Park Road from Route 51 to the Sarah Street approach closed years ago; the only way to get to Island Heights is from Kennedy Township, Pennsylvania, by way of Ewing Road, then turning onto Fleming Park Road (which becomes Grace Street at the bend), then either staying straight on Grace or turning left on William Street towards the only other remaining open segment of Fleming Park Road.

Island Heights consists of twelve streets: William Street (at Island Heights Park), Charles Street, Speer Street, Euclid Avenue, Gordon Street, Fleming Park Road, Sarah Street, William Circle, Louis Drive, Louis Court, Homer Circle, and Bellmawr Drive.

References

Geography of Allegheny County, Pennsylvania
Neighborhoods in Pennsylvania
1960 establishments in Pennsylvania